Georg Stadtmüller (Bürstadt, Hessen, 17 March 1909 – Passau, 1 November 1985) was German historian and Albanologist.

Biography
He studied German history, classic and oriental philology and history in Freiburg in period 1927–1931. He was president of History department on Munich University, specialist for history of European Orient and history of Albanians. In his 1942 work he published the controversial thesis in which he traced the origin of Albanians back to the region of Mat. Stadtmüller and later Stavro Skendi supported the controversial assertion about crypto-religious groups existing in the Balkans in all places where the population converted to Islam. Stadtmüller founded the Albanian Institute in Munich, Germany, in 1963. Stadtmüller is the author of hypothesis that Mat valley was summer pasturage for early Albanians. According to this hypothesis Albanian language does not have loan words for flora and fauna found above 900m because this valley is situated in more than 1,000 m altitude and surrounded by mountains, admitting that flora and fauna found in lower ranges have loanwords originating in Slavic languages.

Selected works 
 Michael Choniates, Metropolit von Athen. 1934 by Pont. Institutum Orientalium Studiorum
 
 Forschung zur albanischen Frühgeschichte, Budapest, 1942
 Die Islamisierung bei den Albanern
 Geschichte Südosteuropas, München 1950
 
 Das albanische Nationalkonzil vom Jahre 1703, Orientalia Christiana Periodica. XXII (1956),
 Research in Early Albanian History (1942)

References

External links 
 Short bio on Munzinger web site
 Die Islamisierung bei den Albanern 
 Short bio on web site of KosovA tek AlbEmigrant

1909 births
1985 deaths
Albanologists
20th-century German historians
German male non-fiction writers